Klaus Groth (24 April 1819 – 1 June 1899) was a Low German poet.

Biography
Groth was born in Heide, in Ditmarschen, the western part of the Duchy of Holstein. He was the oldest son of Hartwig Groth, a miller, and his wife Anna Christina. He spend an idyllic childhood in Heide which later inspired him to a lot of his poetic works. After visiting the local school, he visited the teacher seminar in Tondern from 1838 to 1841. Afterwards, Groth became a teacher at the girls school in his native village, devoting his spare time to the study of philosophy, mathematics, and the natural sciences. Furthermore, he valued his homeland's traditions so that he was involved in the revival of a couple of old traditions in Dithmarschen. Finding no joy in teaching, Groth had many differences with the school board as well as his pupils' parents. In 1847, he suffered a breakdown. Fellow teacher and friend Leonhard Selle invited Groth to spend time with him on the island of Fehmarn, in the Baltic Sea. He remained six years with Selle, and it was there that his famous Low German poetry compilation Quickborn was written. 

Becoming famous in all of Germany when the Quickborn was published in 1852, Groth moved to Kiel shortly after where he set to write more poems and first prose works in Low German. 

Since he was often of poor health, in 1855 he attempted to travel to Rome to recuperate, but he only came as far as Bonn. There, the University of Bonn awarded him with an honorary doctorate for his service to the German language. 

Back in Kiel after two years of travelling, he courted and married Doris Finke in 1859, the daughter of a wealthy wine merchant from Bremen. The couple had four sons. To provide for his family, Groth strove for a position as professor of literature at the University of Kiel where he was appointed professor in 1866, the same year, his oldest son died, and the family moved into a house of their own in the "Schwanenweg". Groth lived in this house until his death.

Through many social gatherings and music evenings in their home that his wife organised, the Groth family established important social contacts, and became friends with many contemporary musicians, for example Clara Schumann and Johannes Brahms, a close friend of Groth. He became acquainted with many painters of his time as well which makes Klaus Groth the most painted poet in the 19th century.

Several calamities in the following years hit Groth very hard. Doris Groth died in 1878 because of tuberculosis, and his youngest son died in 1889 from appendicitis. 

His eightieth birthday in 1899 gave cause for big festivities, especially in Kiel. The cities of Kiel and Heide respectively awarded him with the honorary citizenship. Only a few weeks after his birthday, Klaus Groth died on 1 June 1899. The big funeral service in Kiel was attended by many representatives of the government, politicians, contemporary poets, musicians, and artists.

Works
In his Low German lyric and epic poems, which reflect the influence of Johann Peter Hebel, Groth gives poetic expression to the country life of his northern home; and though his descriptions may not always reflect the peculiar characteristics of the peasantry of Holstein as faithfully as those of his rival Fritz Reuter - Groth strived to show the Low German language as well as the people who spoke it as something noble and worthy of high poetry -, Groth is a lyric poet of genuine inspiration.

His chief works are Quickborn, Volksleben - in plattdeutschen Gedichten Ditmarscher Mundart (1852; 25th ed. 1900; and in (standard) German translations, notably by MJ Berchem, Krefeld, 1896); and two volumes of stories, Vertelln (1835-1859, 3rd ed. 1881); also Vær de Gærn (1858) and Ut min Jungsparadies (1875). 

Groth's Gesammelte Werke appeared in 4 volumes (Kiel, 1893). His Lebenserinnerungen were edited by E. Wolff in 1891; see also K. Eggers, K. Groth und die plattdeutsche Dichtung (1885); and biographies by A. Bartels (1899) and H. Siercks (1899).

Music
Since Groth and his wife were well acquainted with many musicians of their time, a lot of his poems were set to music. All in all, there are 1149 known musical versions of his poems by 224 composers. 

Johannes Brahms set thirteen High German poems to music, among them the poem "Wie Melodien zieht es mir leise durch den Sinn" that became Brahms' No. 1 of his Fünf Lieder, Op. 105.

References

Citations

Cited sources 
 Bichel, Ingel, Bichel, Ulf, Hartig, Joachim, ed. (1994): Klaus Groth. Eine Bildbiographie, Heide 1994, .

 
Höhne, Peter (2010): Klaus Groth - Gesungene Gedichte. Klaus Groth und seine Komponisten, Hamburg: Arezzo Musikverlag.

External links
 Selected poems with English translations lowlands-l.net
 
 

1819 births
1899 deaths
People from Heide
People from the Duchy of Holstein
19th-century German poets
Writers from Schleswig-Holstein
University of Bonn alumni
German male poets
German-language poets
19th-century German male writers